The NRE 3GS21B is a low-emissions diesel genset locomotive built by National Railway Equipment (NRE). Instead of a single prime mover, the NRE genset locomotive has three engines that each can be turned off or on as power is needed reducing overall diesel emissions and improving fuel efficiency. More than 150 of the 3GS21B genset locomotives have been produced to date, with the majority of these units being manufactured at NRE's Mount Vernon shops in Southern Illinois. In addition, three road slug models have also been produced.

Flexibility
Because the engines are modular, flexibility is obtained:
If one engine fails, the others can continue at reduced power.
If a lower axle load is needed, one engine can be left off.
When reduced power is needed, one or more of the engines can be turned off, saving fuel and wear and tear.
The QSK19C engine is common to the four variants of the NRE 3GS21C locomotive.
The QSK19C engine is also widely used for non-railway applications, and spare parts are readily available.

Original buyers

See also
 NRE 3GS21C

References

External links

 National Railway Equipment  – Official N-ViroMotive Product Page

B-B locomotives
NRE locomotives
Railway locomotives introduced in 2006
Diesel-electric locomotives of the United States
EPA Tier 2-compliant locomotives of the United States
Rebuilt locomotives
Standard gauge locomotives of the United States